Peruvanthanam  is a village in Idukki district in the Indian state of Kerala.

Demographics
 India census, Peruvanthanam had a population of 16301 with 8203 males and 8098 females.

References
Pin Code : 685532
Villages in Idukki district